Ålen Church is a parish church of the Church of Norway in Holtålen municipality in Trøndelag county, Norway. It is located in the village of Renbygda. It is the church for the Ålen parish which is part of the Gauldal prosti (deanery) in the Diocese of Nidaros. The white, wooden church was built in a neo-gothic long church style in 1881 using plans drawn up by the architect Jacob Digre. The church seats about 322 people.

History

The earliest existing historical records of the church date back to the year 1381, but the church was not new that year. The church was likely first built in the 12th century. The stave church had a rectangular nave with a narrower, rectangular chancel.

From 1674 to 1676, the church was significantly expanded by adding a new timber-framed nave to the old stave church. The old nave from the older church was converted into the new chancel. The old chancel was remodeled as a new sacristy. Additionally, the church had a cross-arm (transept) added to the north side of the new nave.

The church was designed by Johan Digre. It was consecrated on 15 September 1881. After the new church was completed, the old church was mostly torn down. The only part that was saved was the small entry porch which originally had been built around 1675. Some of the interior decor elements from the old church were saved and sent to museum in Trondheim. The pulpit from 1705 and an altarpiece from the 17th century were later sent to the newly built Hessdalen Church in 1940.

See also
List of churches in Nidaros

References

Holtålen
Churches in Trøndelag
Long churches in Norway
Wooden churches in Norway
19th-century Church of Norway church buildings
Churches completed in 1881
12th-century establishments in Norway